China National Highway 316 (G316) runs from Fuzhou in Fujian to Lanzhou in Gansu, via Nanchang (in Jiangxi) and Wuhan (in Hubei). It is 2915 kilometres in length. The highway crosses the provinces of Gansu, Shaanxi, Hubei, Jiangxi, and Fujian.

In Gansu, from Lanzhou to the junction at Huichuan Town (in Weiyuan County, Gansu, 35 or so km south of Lintao), G316 also doubles as China National Highway 212. On much of this section (Lanzhou to Lintao) it has been converted to an expressway, designated G75 (the Linhai Expressway).

In south-eastern Hubei (from Ezhou to the junction along the Jiangxi border) the G316 doubles as China National Highway 106.

Route and distance

See also
 China National Highways

Transport in Fujian
Transport in Gansu
Transport in Jiangxi
Transport in Hubei
Transport in Shaanxi
316